Into the Now is the fifth studio album by the rock band Tesla. Following a six-year hiatus due to Tommy Skeoch's rehabilitation for drug abuse, Tesla reunited for this album released in 2004.

Track listing
 Into the Now (Hannon, Keith, Luccketta) - 4:25
 Look @ Me (Hannon, Keith, Skeoch, Sommers, Wheat) - 4:16
 What a Shame (Hannon, Keith, Wheat) - 4:29
 Heaven Nine Eleven (Hannon) - 4:38
 Words Can't Explain (Hannon, Keith) - 3:14
 Caught in a Dream (Hannon, Keith) - 4:50
 Miles Away (Hannon, Keith) - 6:55
 Mighty Mouse (Hannon, Keith, Sommers, Wheat) - 4:14
 Got No Glory (Hannon, Keith) - 4:19
 Come to Me (Hannon, Keith) - 4:43
 Recognize (Hannon, Keith, Skeoch) - 5:00
 Only You (Hannon, Keith, Skeoch, Sommers) - 4:33

Personnel

Tesla
Jeff Keith: Lead Vocal
Frank Hannon: Acoustic & Electric Guitars, Keyboards, Backing Vocals
Tommy Skeoch: Acoustic & Electric Guitars, Backing Vocals
Brian Wheat: Bass
Troy Luccketta: Drums, Percussion

Additional personnel
 The Section Quartet: strings, arranged by Eric Gorfain
 Michael Rosen: loops

Production
Produced By Tesla, Michael Rosen & Roger Sommers
Engineered & Mixed By Michael Rosen
Mastered By George Marino

Charts

Album

Singles and album tracks

References

2004 albums
Tesla (band) albums
Noise Records albums